Allied occupation may refer to:
Allied-occupied Austria
Allied-occupied Germany
Occupation of Japan